The 2005 Calder Cup playoffs of the American Hockey League began on April 19, 2005. The sixteen teams that qualified, eight from each conference, played best-of-7 series for division semifinals, finals and conference finals.  The conference champions played a best-of-7 series for the Calder Cup. The Calder Cup Final ended on June 10, 2005 with the Philadelphia Phantoms defeating the Chicago Wolves four games to none to win the second Calder Cup in team history. Philadelphia's Antero Niittymaki won the Jack A. Butterfield Trophy as playoff MVP.

Philadelphia set an AHL record by winning 11 consecutive home games in a single playoff. By playing the postseason in the Wachovia Center, the team also managed to settle postseason attendance records, with 20,103 spectators in the cup-clinching game 4 against Chicago.

As the National Hockey League was in the midst of a lockout that canceled that league's entire 2004–05 season, the 2005 playoffs featured a higher number of players from the NHL.

Playoff seeds
After the 2004–05 AHL regular season, 16 teams qualified for the playoffs. The top four teams from each division qualified for the playoffs. The Rochester Americans were the Western Conference regular season champions as well as the Macgregor Kilpatrick Trophy winners with the best overall regular season record. The Manchester Monarchs were the Eastern Conference regular season champions.

Eastern Conference

Atlantic Division
Manchester Monarchs – Eastern Conference regular season champions, 110 points
Hartford Wolf Pack – 106 points
Lowell Lock Monsters – 100 points
Providence Bruins – 90 points

East Division
Binghamton Senators –  106 points
Philadelphia Phantoms – 103 points
Norfolk Admirals – 93 points
Wilkes-Barre/Scranton Penguins – 92 points

Western Conference

North Division
Rochester Americans – Western Conference regular season champions; Macgregor Kilpatrick Trophy winners, 112 points
St. John's Maple Leafs – 98 points
Manitoba Moose – 98 points
Hamilton Bulldogs – 89 points

West Division
Chicago Wolves –  105 points
Milwaukee Admirals – 103 points
Cincinnati Mighty Ducks – 93 points
Houston Aeros – 92 points

Bracket

In each round the higher seed receives home ice advantage, meaning they can play a maximum of four home games if the series reaches seven games. There is no set series format for each series due to arena scheduling conflicts and travel considerations.

Division Semifinals
Note 1: All times are in Eastern Time (UTC−4).
Note 2: Game times in italics signify games to be played only if necessary.
Note 3: Home team is listed first.

Eastern Conference

Atlantic Division

(A1) Manchester Monarchs vs. (A4) Providence Bruins

(A2) Hartford Wolf Pack vs. (A3) Lowell Lock Monsters

East Division

(E1) Binghamton Senators vs. (E4) Wilkes-Barre/Scranton Penguins

(E2) Philadelphia Phantoms vs. (E3) Norfolk Admirals

Western Conference

North Division

(N1) Rochester Americans vs. (N4) Hamilton Bulldogs

(N2) St. John's Maple Leafs vs. (N3) Manitoba Moose

West Division

(W1) Chicago Wolves vs. (W4) Houston Aeros

(W2) Milwaukee Admirals vs. (W3) Cincinnati Mighty Ducks

Division Finals

Eastern Conference

Atlantic Division

(A3) Lowell Lock Monsters vs. (A4) Providence Bruins

East Division

(E2) Philadelphia Phantoms vs. (E4) Wilkes-Barre/Scranton Penguins

Western Conference

North Division

(N1) Rochester Americans vs. (N3) Manitoba Moose

West Division

(W1) Chicago Wolves vs. (W3) Cincinnati Mighty Ducks

Conference finals

Eastern Conference

(E2) Philadelphia Phantoms vs. (A4) Providence Bruins

Western Conference

(W1) Chicago Wolves vs. (N3) Manitoba Moose

Calder Cup Final

(W1) Chicago Wolves vs. (E2) Philadelphia Phantoms

Playoff statistical leaders

Leading skaters 

These are the top ten skaters based on points. If there is a tie in points, goals take precedence over assists.

GP = Games played; G = Goals; A = Assists; Pts = Points; +/– = Plus-minus; PIM = Penalty minutes

Leading goaltenders 

This is a combined table of the top five goaltenders based on goals against average and the top five goaltenders based on save percentage with at least 420 minutes played. The table is initially sorted by goals against average, with the criterion for inclusion in bold.

GP = Games played; W = Wins; L = Losses; SA = Shots against; GA = Goals against; GAA = Goals against average; SV% = Save percentage; SO = Shutouts; TOI = Time on ice (in minutes)

See also
2004–05 AHL season
List of AHL seasons

References

Calder Cup playoffs
Calder Cup